Quizlet is a multi-national American company that provides tools for studying and learning. It was founded by Andrew Sutherland in October 2005 and released to the public in January 2007. Quizlet's primary products include digital flash cards, matching games, practice electronic assessments, and live quizzes. In 2017, 1 in 2 high school students used Quizlet. As of December 2021, Quizlet has over 500 million user-generated flashcard sets, and more than 60 million active users according to Quizlet's website.

Company history
Quizlet was founded in 2005 by Andrew Sutherland as a studying tool to aid in memorization for his French class, which he "aced". Quizlet's blog, written mostly by Andrew in the earlier days of the company, claimed it reached 50,000 registered users in 252 days online. On April 15, 2008, Quizlet made its first national TV appearance when Sutherland was featured on the Mike and Juliet Show. In the following two years, Quizlet reached its 1,000,000th registered user. Until 2011, Quizlet shared staff and financial resources with the Collectors Weekly website. In 2015, Quizlet announced raising $12 million from Union Square Ventures, Costanoa Venture Capital, Altos Ventures, and Owl Ventures to expand its digital study tools and grow internationally. In 2011, Quizlet added the ability to listen to content using text-to-speech. In August 2012, it released an app for the iPhone and iPad and shortly afterward one for Android devices. Quizlet launched a redesign in August 2016 and hired Matt Glotzbach as CEO a few months earlier in May. Also in 2016, Quizlet launched "Quizlet Live", a real-time online matching game where teams compete to answer all 12 questions correctly without an incorrect answer along the way. Glotzbach announced in 2018 that Quizlet would be opening offices in Denver, Colorado in 2018, announcing "a big vision at Quizlet to provide the most intelligent study tools in the world, and our expansion into Denver, a city with incredible tech ingenuity, will help us more quickly build the next generation of learning tools used by students everywhere". As of 2019, Andrew Sutherland is no longer with Quizlet or its board. During the COVID-19 pandemic, Glotzbach announced he was opening Quizlet's premium service, Quizlet Teacher, for free to all users who have an account registered as a teacher. As of August 1, 2022, Learn and Test modes became part of Quizlet Plus, meaning they are no longer free. Later that year Quizlet announced a new CEO, Lex Bayer .

Study modes and games
As a memorization tool, Quizlet lets registered users create sets of terms and definitions customized for their own needs. These sets of terms can then be accessible to students by studying a variety of modes.

 Flash Cards 
 This mode is similar to paper flashcards. Users are shown a "card" for each term, which they can flip over by clicking or using the arrow keys or space bar. The user has the option for the face of the card to be an image, a word, or both
 Learn
 In this mode, users answer flashcard, multiple choice, and written questions repeatedly. New words from the set are slowly introduced, and words already answered will return in the form of written questions until the word is identified correctly repeatedly.
 Write
 In this mode, users are shown a term or definition and must type the term or definition that goes with what is shown. After entering their answer, they see if their answer was correct, and can choose to override the automatic grading and count their answer as right if needed. This mode was originally the "Learn" mode before being replaced by the newer version above.
 Spell
 In this mode, the term is read out loud and users must type in the term with the correct spelling. If the user gets every answer correct, they are rewarded with a video of a monster truck doing a jump, wheelie, and flip. This game was previously known as Speller.
 Match
 In this mode, users are presented with a grid of scattered terms. Users drag terms on top of their associated definitions to remove them from the grid and try to clear the grid in the fastest time possible. Micro-match is a related matching game geared towards mobile devices and devices with small screens. Match was previously attributed as "Scatter", though the game was the same.
 Gravity
 In this mode, definitions scroll vertically down the screen in the shape of asteroids. The user must type the term that goes with the definition before it reaches the bottom. Occasionally, an asteroid will be red. If the user misses a red asteroid twice, the game is over. It is one of the 'Play' study modes. Gravity was adapted from a previous game, Space Race. The user can pick the level of difficulty and game type. An exploit for this game is to put it on "starred mode" and select one word for starred mode  by looking at the cards, and then clicking on the star-shaped button.) Going onto the game and starting it with starred mode still on, the user will only have one word, and can thus copy & paste the same word over and over again, resulting in ridiculously high scores. Therefore, games on starred mode will not appear on the leaderboards.
 Live
In this mode, a Quizlet user (usually a teacher) breaks their class up into teams or plays the game with students individually. The teacher chooses whether to start with a definition or term. Each team will have to choose the correct term/definition to win. This game works by choosing a set of flashcards and putting these flashcards into a format that works for the game. If a player or team chooses the incorrect term or definition, the score will reset.

Controversy
Students on Quizlet may upload information that can be used to cheat within the classroom. In a survey at a High School in Orlando, a student was quoted saying "If someone put $100 in front of you, would you take it?", referring to the ease with which students can use platforms like Quizlet to cheat on schoolwork.

As of September 2022, Quizlet's website has an "Honor Code" requiring all users of the website to not misuse the platform for academic cheating.

See also
 Chegg
 Course Hero
 Kahoot!
 Wordly Wise

References

External links
 Official website

Internet properties established in 2007
American educational websites
Language learning software
Albany, California